Rogelio Juárez Robinson (born 7 July 1991) is a Panamanian footballer who last played as a  midfielder for Corbett FC.

Career

Before the second half of 2013-13, Juárez signed for Salvadoran side Santa Tecla. Before the 2015 season, he signed for Moca in the Dominican Republic. Before the second half of 2016-17, Juárez signed for Honduran club Social Sol, where he made 2 league appearances and scored 0 goals. On 5 February 2017, he debuted for Social Sol during a 1-2 loss to Vida. Before the second half of 2017-18, Juárez signed for Arnett Gardens in Jamaica. In 2018, he signed for Bolivian team Avilés Industrial. In 2019, he signed for Mount Pleasant in Jamaica after receiving offers from Honduras. In 2021, Juárez signed for Indian outfit Lonestar Kashmir.

References

External links

 
 Rogelio Juárez at playmakerstats.com

Association football midfielders
Living people
Panamanian footballers
Panamanian expatriate footballers
Expatriate footballers in Honduras
Expatriate footballers in El Salvador
Expatriate footballers in the Dominican Republic
Expatriate footballers in Jamaica
Expatriate footballers in Bolivia
1991 births
Expatriate footballers in India
Panamanian expatriate sportspeople in Jamaica
Panamanian expatriate sportspeople in Honduras
Panamanian expatriate sportspeople in El Salvador
Panamanian expatriate sportspeople in Bolivia
Panamanian expatriate sportspeople in India